Tungalam is a suburban area in Visakhapatnam, India.

History
Tungalam, a fast developing village, has a history of over 100 years. Nothing historical here but, has been recognised in many aspects.
People from different places come to this village for their livelyhood as it concentric place for many industries .
Latest sportspark k nitish reddy u19 cricket player is from this place.

Features

Other information
Most of the people living here work in AutoNagar industrial area. On 14 November 2008, ramoji
Rao of Eenadu group inaugurated Eenadu's main office which is located at Seethmmadara. This place is in Gajuwaka Constituency, which is previously a part of Pendurthi constituency  before constituency reformations. The first counselor of this ward was Mr. Kaki. Govinda Reddy of TDP party. This ward has been awarded "fastest developing ward" under the ruling of Mr.Govind Reddy. Telugu Desam Party which was led by Mr Chandra Babu Naidu gave him State secretary and also worked as Telugu Yuvatha Chief Secretary of Andhra Pradesh.  BHPV, a well-renowned company which has been taken over by BHEL recently is just besides Tungalam. Most of the people from here work abroad, mostly in Singapore, Qatar and Dubai. This village used to be in Gajuwaka municipality with 5th ward but has been merged into Greater Visakha Municipal Corporation with 59th ward.

On 20 April 1989 the fans of Sri kala Ratna NTR & Bala Krishna Fans Constructed Jai Santoshimatha Temple.  This mandir was reconstructed by nandamuri fans with around 10Lakhs rupees and was inaugurated by Mr Nata Ratna Nandamuri Bala Krishna on 24 February 2011.  He attended to various poojas at this place.

Transport
RTC buses are available here. Buses are also available at BHPV.
APSRTC routes

References

Neighbourhoods in Visakhapatnam